Jerome Davis may refer to:

 Jerome Davis (sociologist) (1891–1979), American sociologist & activist
 Jerome C. Davis (1822–1881), farmer who gave the name to the city of Davis, California
 Jerry Davis (American football) (1924–2006), American football player
 Jerome Davis (nose tackle) (born 1962), American football player
 Jerome Davis (offensive tackle) (born 1974), CFL and NFL football player
 Jerome Davis (athlete) (born 1977), American former sprinter

See also
Gerry Davis (disambiguation)
Jerry Davis (disambiguation)